Nabin Chandra Bag is an Indian politician, member of All India Trinamool Congress. He is an MLA, elected from the  Khandaghosh constituency in the 2011 West Bengal Legislative Assembly election as a Communist Party of India (Marxist) candidate. He left the party and joined Trinamool Congress in 2015. In 2016 and 2021 assembly election he was re-elected from the same constituency.

References 

Trinamool Congress politicians from West Bengal
Living people
People from Purba Bardhaman district
West Bengal MLAs 2021–2026
Year of birth missing (living people)